The 1905 Belfast North by-election was held on 14 September 1905 when the incumbent Irish Unionist
MP, Sir James Horner Haslett died.  It was retained by the Unionist candidate Sir Daniel Dixon.

External links 
A Vision of Britain Through Time

References

1905 elections in the United Kingdom
North
20th century in Belfast
1905 elections in Ireland